The Valvatida are an order of starfish in the class Asteroidea, which contains 695 species in 172 genera in 17 families.

Description 
The order encompasses both tiny species, which are only a few millimetres in diameter, like those in the genus Asterina, and species which can reach up to 75 cm, such as species in the genus Thromidia. Almost all species in this order have five arms with tube feet. This order is primarily identified by the presence of conspicuous marginal ossicles, which characterize most of the species. Most members of this order have five arms and two rows of tube feet with suckers. Some species have paxillae and in some, the main pedicellariae are clamp-like and recessed into the skeletal plates. This group includes the cushion star, and the leather star.

Families
According to the World Register of Marine Species, the following families are included in Valvatida:

 family Acanthasteridae Gervais, 1841
 family Archasteridae Viguier, 1878
 family Asterinidae Gray, 1840
 family Asterodiscididae Rowe, 1977
 family Asteropseidae Hotchkiss & Clark, 1976
 family Chaetasteridae Sladen, 1889
 family Ganeriidae Sladen, 1889
 family Goniasteridae Forbes, 1841
 family Leilasteridae Jangoux & Aziz, 1988
 family Mithrodiidae Viguier, 1878
 family Odontasteridae Verrill, 1899
 family Ophidiasteridae Verrill, 1870
 family Oreasteridae Fisher, 1911
 family Podosphaerasteridae Fujita & Rowe, 2002
 family Poraniidae Perrier, 1875
 family Solasteridae Viguier, 1878
 family Sphaerasteridae Schöndorf, 1906 †

References